Homalocalyx chapmanii is a member of the family Myrtaceae endemic to Western Australia.

It blooms between September and October producing red-pink-purple flowers.

It is found on undulating plains and among weather granite in the northern Wheatbelt region of Western Australia between Carnamah and Three Springs where it grows in sandy soils.

References

chapmanii
Endemic flora of Western Australia
Myrtales of Australia
Rosids of Western Australia
Plants described in 1987